Núbia Aparecida Soares (born 26 March 1996) is a Brazilian athlete whose specialty is the triple jump. She competed at the 2015 World Championships in Beijing without qualifying for the final.  She competed at the 2020 Summer Olympics.

Her personal bests in the event are 14.69 metres outdoors (Sotteville-lès-Rouen 2018) and 14.00 metres indoors (Birmingham 2018). 

Before turning to athletics, she was a handball player.

Competition record

References

External links
 

1996 births
Living people
Brazilian female triple jumpers
World Athletics Championships athletes for Brazil
Athletes (track and field) at the 2015 Pan American Games
Athletes (track and field) at the 2016 Summer Olympics
Olympic athletes of Brazil
South American Games gold medalists for Brazil
South American Games medalists in athletics
Athletes (track and field) at the 2018 South American Games
Pan American Games athletes for Brazil
South American Games gold medalists in athletics
Athletes (track and field) at the 2020 Summer Olympics
20th-century Brazilian women
21st-century Brazilian women